Saitov may refer to:
 Asiat Saitov (Asjat, Asyat; born 1965), Russian professional road racing cyclist; married to athlete Svetlana Masterkova (from 1994);
 Boris Vladimirovich Saitov (1897—1942), Russian musicologist and bibliographer; son of Vladimir Saitov ;
 Oleg Saitov (born 1974), Russian boxer;
 Viktor Petrovich Saitov (1941—2007), Soviet and Russian theatre actor (Perm Academic Theatre), People's Artist of the RSFSR, State Prize of the Moldova Winner; 
 Vladimir Ivanovich Saitov (1849—1938), Russian historian of Russian literature, bibliographer, Corresponding Member of the Academy of Sciences of the USSR , ;

See also 
 Saidov - surname